Buchwald vs. Paramount (1990), was a breach of contract lawsuit filed and decided in California in which humorist and writer Art Buchwald alleged that Paramount Pictures stole his script idea and turned it into the 1988 movie Coming to America. Buchwald won the lawsuit and was awarded damages, and then accepted a settlement from Paramount before any appeal took place.

The decision was important mainly for the court's determination in the damages phase of the trial that Paramount used "unconscionable" means of determining how much to pay authors, which is widely called "Hollywood Accounting." Paramount claimed, and provided accounting evidence to support the claim, that despite the movie's $288 million in revenues, it had earned no net profit, according to the definition of "net profit" in Buchwald's contract, and hence Buchwald was owed nothing. The court agreed with Buchwald's argument that this was "unconscionable" and therefore invalid. Fearing a loss if it appealed, and the subsequent implications of the unconscionability decision across all its other contracts, Paramount settled for $900,000. The case was the subject of a 1992 book, Fatal Subtraction: The Inside Story of Buchwald v. Paramount by Pierce O'Donnell, the lawyer who represented Buchwald, and Los Angeles Times reporter Dennis McDougal.

Timeline
In 1982, Buchwald wrote a screen treatment titled "It's a Crude, Crude World" (later renamed "King for a Day") that was pitched to Jeffrey Katzenberg of Paramount, with the intention of starring Eddie Murphy, who was under contract to Paramount at the time. According to the court documents, the synopsis for "King for a Day" was:

Paramount optioned the treatment in early 1983 and commissioned several unsuccessful scripts from several screenwriters. John Landis was considered as the director from time to time. After two years of development hell, Paramount decided to abandon the project in March 1985.

In May 1986, Paramount's rival Warner Bros. optioned Buchwald's treatment.

In the summer of 1987, Paramount began to develop a movie that was credited as being based on a story by Eddie Murphy, and which was to be directed by John Landis. The story outline was similar to Buchwald's story idea, and to the failed Paramount scripts that had been based on it.

In January 1988, Warner Bros. canceled their version of Buchwald's project, citing the Paramount project.

When the movie Coming to America was released by Paramount in 1988, Eddie Murphy was given sole story credit. Buchwald was not paid, or even credited as the story writer. Buchwald sued Paramount for breach of contract, as his contract with Paramount stated that he would be paid a certain amount if his treatment were made into a film.

Decision
The California Superior Court decided in 1990 that Buchwald had demonstrated by a preponderance of the evidence that his story treatment and Paramount's unsuccessful scripts based on the treatment were "similar" to that of the Coming to America movie. Together with the evidence that Murphy and Landis previously had access to Buchwald's treatment, the court determined that the movie's story was indeed "based upon" Buchwald's treatment. Since Paramount never paid Buchwald, as the option agreement specified would occur if a movie based on his treatment were ever released, Paramount did indeed breach the contract.

In the second phase of the trial in which the court determined the appropriate amount of damages to be paid to Buchwald, Paramount testified that despite the movie's $288 million in ticket sales, it had spent so much money on the movie's development and marketing that, according to the formula specified in Buchwald's contract, Paramount had made no "net profit".

The court then found that the formula was "unconscionable" and that Buchwald therefore could pursue a separate tort lawsuit against the company.

Fearing a loss on appeal and, presumably, a wave of lawsuits by authors claiming they, too, had been wronged by the unconscionable net profit formula, Paramount settled with Buchwald and his producing partner for $900,000. As part of the settlement, the "unconscionability" decision was vacated.

Implications
The accounting formulas used by the studios have allegedly been designed specifically to ensure that it is mathematically impossible for almost any movie to show a net profit. Specifically, the net profit formula in authors' contracts does not correspond to the net profit formula of generally accepted accounting principles that the movie studios use when creating their financial statements that are reported to the U.S. Securities and Exchange Commission and to the investing public. What the court described as an "unconscionable" formula in Buchwald's contract effectively double-counts many costs borne by the movie studio.

Some commentators have claimed this lawsuit was a watershed that would affect Hollywood's payments to anyone who enjoyed "profit participation" by forcing a change to the net profit formulas. However, a ruling by the California Superior Court in Batfilm Productions v. Warner Bros. regarding the 1989 Batman movie stated that a similar formula was not unconscionable. To date, there has been no review of this type of claim by an appellate court, meaning that the superior courts cannot look to an appellate court's decision for guidance.

Still, the case has caused nearly all studios and production companies to be more careful about how they handle scripts. Concerned that "similarities" between future script drafts and movies could cause lawsuits, nearly all studios and production companies now return unsolicited scripts to their authors unopened.

Response from John Landis
In the retrospective interviews included on the 2007 DVD release of Coming to America, John Landis and screenwriters Barry Blaustein and David Sheffield make no mention of Art Buchwald's lawsuit, and maintain that the film's story originated with Eddie Murphy, with Blaustein and Sheffield writing the screenplay from Murphy's 25-page treatment. In an interview filmed around the time of the film's theatrical release, and included on the DVD, Murphy himself claims that he came up with the idea for the movie while on tour.

In Giulia D'Agnolo Vallan's 2008 book John Landis, Landis is quoted as saying that Art Buchwald's case against Paramount was "without merit," going on to state the following:

Landis also provided the following response as to why Buchwald's lawsuit received more attention in the press than other similar lawsuits:

See also 
 Leibovitz v. Paramount Pictures Corp.
 Paramount Communications, Inc. v. QVC Network, Inc.
 United States v. Paramount Pictures, Inc.

References

Further reading

  On the web

United States contract case law
1990 in United States case law
California state case law
Paramount Pictures
Screenwriting
Law articles needing an infobox
Coming to America (film series)